Mike King may refer to:

Mike King (advocate) (born 1962), New Zealand mental health advocate, television personality and former comedian
Mike King (BMX rider) (born 1969), American former professional BMX racer
Mike King (radio announcer), American radio broadcaster
Mike King (transportation executive), American businessman and Kansas Secretary of Transportation
Mike King (Canadian football) (1925–2018), former Canadian football player
Mike King (journalist) (born 1950), American Journalist
Mike King (basketball) (born 1978), American former basketball player
Michael King (baseball) (born 1995), American baseball player

See also
Michael King (disambiguation)